Aaron John Walpole (born 7 March 1979), is a Canadian born musical actor, who placed third in the 2005 season of Canadian Idol. He is best known for playing the role of Lonnie in the 2010 Toronto Run of Rock of Ages and Annas in the 2012 Broadway run of Jesus Christ Superstar. He appeared in the 2014 Broadway revival of Les Misérables, as a part of the ensemble.

Walpole's TV/film credits include Deacons for Defense as Jimmy (2003), Canadian Idol (2005), Silent but Deadly as Rob (2011), and Breakout Kings as Skip Blax (2011).

Early life

Born in London, Ontario, in 1979, Walpole is one of three children. At 10 years old, his mother Jody Mae Cline, sat him and his brothers down, to watch the musical Jesus Christ Superstar for Easter. After seeing Carl Anderson's rendition of "Heaven on their Minds", Aaron decided to become a musical actor. He memorized the whole show, with the help of his father Robert Walpole's vinyl copy. In 1998, he entered Sheridan College's musical theater performance program, and graduated in 2001.

Personal life

On October 4, 2014, Walpole married Stefanie Oechslin, after having dated since 2010. They met at the street corner of King Street and John Street in Toronto, after Stefanie had recognized him from Rock of Ages as Lonnie. They started their life as a married couple in New York, NY, where Aaron appeared in the 2014 Les Misérables Broadway revival.

TV and film

Walpole appeared in the 2005 session of Canadian Idol, in which he placed third after Rex Goudie and Melissa O'Neil. Other TV credits include Breakout Kings as Bill Gierhart, Felling the Shadows and Deacons of Defense. He also starred in the 2011 movie Silent But Deadly as Rob.

Broadway

Walpole had his Broadway debut in 2012, as Annas in the 2011 revival of Jesus Christ Superstar. The production had previously played at the Stratford Festival and the La Jolla Playhouse, before it was moved to the Neil Simon Theater in New York. The production ultimately closed after only four months on July 1, due to bad ticket sales.

In 2014, he joined the cast of the 2014 revival of Les Misérables. Besides playing Champmathieu, Brujon, Loud Hailer in his ensemble track, he was an understudy for the role of Jean Valjean. He previously was in the American tour and Canadian production

References

External links

1979 births
Living people
Musicians from London, Ontario
Canadian Idol participants
Canadian male stage actors
Canadian male musical theatre actors
21st-century Canadian male singers